The 2019–20 Winthrop Eagles men's basketball team represented Winthrop University in the 2019–20 NCAA Division I men's basketball season. The Eagles, led by eighth-year head coach Pat Kelsey, played their home games at the Winthrop Coliseum in Rock Hill, South Carolina as members of the Big South Conference. They finished the season 24–10, 15–3 in Big South play to finish in a tie for the Big South regular season championship. They defeated USC Upstate, Gardner–Webb and Hampton to be champions of the Big South tournament and earn the conference's automatic bid to the NCAA tournament. However, the NCAA Tournament was cancelled amid the COVID-19 pandemic.

Previous season
The Eagles finished the 2018–19 season 18–12 overall, 10–6 in Big South play to finish in a tie for second place. In the Big South tournament, they were defeated by Charleston Southern in the quarterfinals.

Roster

Schedule and results

|-
!colspan=12 style=| Non-conference regular season

|-
!colspan=9 style=| Big South Conference regular season

|-
!colspan=12 style=| Big South tournament
|-

Source

References

Winthrop Eagles men's basketball seasons
Winthrop
Winthrop Eagles men's basketball
Winthrop Eagles men's basketball